German submarine U-678 was a Type VIIC U-boat built for Nazi Germany's Kriegsmarine for service during World War II.
She was laid down on 3 September 1942 by Howaldtswerke, Hamburg as yard number 827, launched on 18 September 1943 and commissioned on 25 October 1943 under Oberleutnant zur See Guido Hyronimus.

Design
German Type VIIC submarines were preceded by the shorter Type VIIB submarines. U-678 had a displacement of  when at the surface and  while submerged. She had two shafts and two  propellers.

U-678 was fitted with five  torpedo tubes (four fitted at the bow and one at the stern), fourteen torpedoes, one  SK C/35 naval gun, (220 rounds), one  Flak M42 and two twin  C/30 anti-aircraft guns. The boat had a complement of between forty-four and sixty.

Service history
The boat's career began with training at 5th U-boat Flotilla on 25 October 1943, followed by active service on 1 June 1944 as part of the 7th Flotilla for the remainder of her short service. In one patrol she sank no ships. U-678 was sunk on 6 July 1944 in the English Channel in position , by depth charges from the Canadian destroyers ,  and the Royal Navy corvette . All crew members died.

References

Bibliography

External links

German Type VIIC submarines
1943 ships
U-boats commissioned in 1943
Ships lost with all hands
U-boats sunk in 1944
U-boats sunk by depth charges
U-boats sunk by Canadian warships
U-boats sunk by British warships
World War II shipwrecks in the English Channel
World War II submarines of Germany
Ships built in Hamburg
Maritime incidents in July 1944